James Scott (1895 – 1 July 1916) was a Scottish professional footballer who played as a forward in the Scottish League for Raith Rovers. He scored on his only appearance for Scotland in a wartime international in 1916, during the First World War. He was described as "an all-round forward" and "the most consistent goalscorer Raith have ever had".

Personal life 
Scott was born in Airdrie to James Scott and Annabella Bennett. He attended Airdrie Academy and later became an apprentice wire rope maker with the Caledonian Wire Rope Company. On 4 April 1915, Scott married Catherine Reekie and they had one child, James. Scott served as a private in McCrae's Battalion of the Royal Scots during the First World War. On the first day of the Somme, he was hit in the stomach and neck by machine gun fire and killed during an attack on Ovillers-la-Boisselle. Scott is commemorated on the Thiepval Memorial.

Career statistics

Honours 
 Raith Rovers Hall of Fame

References 

Scottish footballers
1916 deaths
British Army personnel of World War I
1895 births
Scottish Football League players
Raith Rovers F.C. players
Footballers from Airdrie, North Lanarkshire
Royal Scots soldiers
McCrae's Battalion
Scottish military personnel
Association football forwards
British military personnel killed in the Battle of the Somme
Scotland wartime international footballers
People educated at Airdrie Academy
Petershill F.C. players
Scottish Junior Football Association players